For Marx is a 1965 book by the philosopher Louis Althusser, a leading theoretician of the French Communist Party (PCF), in which the author reinterprets the work of the philosopher Karl Marx, proposing an epistemological break between the young, Hegelian Marx, and the old Marx, the author of Das Kapital (1867–1883). The book, first published in France by François Maspero, established Althusser's reputation. The texts presented in For Marx are theoretical interventions in a definite conjuncture, particularly aiming at the definition of the lines to be pursued by the PCF after Stalin's years in the Soviet Union. Althusser's position is of theoretical antihumanism, and is against the teleology of history. Althusser defends that history is a process without subject and with an open end, but that has determinations that can be theorized by the science of history as constructed by Marx in his mature work, Das Kapital. Society is then conceptualized as a complex whole articulated in dominance by the economy where several social practices co-exist with a relative autonomy, introducing the concept overdetemination to characterize the levels of effectivity.

Background, contents and publication history
Except for its introduction, the chapters of For Marx first appeared as articles that were published in journals of the French Communist Party between 1960 and 1964. For Marx was first published in 1965 by François Maspero. An Italian translation was published in 1967, and an English translation, by Ben Brewster, in 1969. The book has been published in English by Verso Books with its most recent edition dating 2005. The book is composed of the following essays:

To My English Readers

Introduction: Today

1. Feuerbach’s ‘Philosophical Manifestoes’

2. ‘On the Young Marx’

3. Contradiction and Overdetermination

4. The ‘Piccolo Teatro’: Bertolazzi and Brecht

5. The ‘1844 Manuscripts’ of Karl Marx

6. On the Materialist Dialectic

7. Marxism and Humanism

Reception
For Marx established Althusser's reputation. Together with Reading Capital (1965), the book drew Althusser to the attention of French intellectuals and attracted a significant international readership. It provided one of the most politically influential of the philosophical reinterpretations of Das Kapital that were made by Marxists in the 1960s and 1970s. The appearance of Reading Capital and For Marx in English translation influenced the development of Marxist thought in the Anglophone world throughout the 1970s. However, For Marx has attracted criticism from both anti-Marxists, such as the conservative philosopher Roger Scruton, and from Marxist theorists, such as the Marxian economist Harry Cleaver. According to the philologist Sebastiano Timpanaro, the Marxist Italian philosopher Cesare Luporini, despite his largely favorable view of Althusser, commented that Althusser's anti-humanism "manifests itself in a tendency to make man disappear as much as possible from the framework of the so-called human sciences." This position has been refuted by Althusser himself in later texts, especially The Humanist Controversy.

Scruton maintains that For Marx is poorly written and obscure. Scruton criticizes Althusser for employing technical terms without explaining them. He also argues that it is doubtful that Althusser's interpretation of historical materialism is true to Marx's intentions, and that it does not deserve to be considered a coherent theory, that it effectively abandons the Marxian thesis that base determines superstructure, that it effectively abandons historical materialism itself, that it is irrefutable in the sense that no possible event would be inconsistent with it, and that it makes no useful predictions. He further suggests that Althusser's supporters had difficulty agreeing on how For Marx should be understood.

Cleaver considers For Marx and Reading Capital an attempt by Althusser and his colleagues to reinterpret Marx with the "aim of revitalizing dialectical materialism as an ideology to mediate the widely discredited political practices of the French Communist Party." He criticizes Althusser's science of history for being ahistorical and abstract. According to Cleaver, Althusser was subsequently critical of For Marx, believing that it largely ignored the class struggle. Cleaver writes that the only revision Althusser considered necessary was to redefine philosophy, from being a "theory of theoretical practice" to being "the class struggle in theory", and that Althusser thus retained the basic theoretical structure of For Marx.

See also
 Louis Althusser and the Traditions of French Marxism

External links
For Marx

References

Bibliography
Books

 
 
 
 
 
 
 
 

1965 non-fiction books
Books about Karl Marx
French non-fiction books
Marxist works
Philosophy books
Works by Louis Althusser